Dehnar (also Romanized as Dehnār) is a village in Kuhestan Rural District, Kelardasht District, Chalus County, Mazandaran Province, Iran. At the 2006 census, its population was 60, in 16 families.

References 

Populated places in Chalus County